Willie Arthur Royster (April 11, 1954 – November 23, 2015) was an American professional baseball player. The catcher spent eleven seasons in minor league baseball, with a brief, four-game Major League trial for the  Baltimore Orioles.

Royster was chosen by the Orioles in the 22nd round of the 1972 Major League Baseball Draft. He played in the minors from 1972 to 1976 and 1978–1981 — missing the entire 1977 season — until a breakout season with the 1981 Charlotte O's of the Double-A Southern League saw him hit 31 home runs and drive in 88 runs batted in, both career highs.  Baltimore recalled him after the September 1 roster expansion.

In Royster's four MLB games played, he appeared as a late-inning defensive replacement and pinch hitter.  In his four big-league at bats, he struck out twice and grounded out twice.

He returned to the minors in 1982, and his pro career ended after the 1983 season.  He played all but 66 of his 961 minor-league games in the Orioles' organization. Willie died at his home in the Ocean View section of Dennis Township, New Jersey on November 23, 2015 at the age of 61.

References

External links
, or Pura Pelota (VPBL stats)

1954 births
2015 deaths
African-American baseball players
Asheville Orioles players
Baltimore Orioles players
Baseball players from Virginia
Bluefield Orioles players
Charlotte O's players
Evansville Triplets players
Howard University alumni
Lodi Orioles players
Major League Baseball catchers
Miami Orioles players
Navegantes del Magallanes players
American expatriate baseball players in Venezuela
Niagara Falls Pirates players
People from Dennis Township, New Jersey
Rochester Red Wings players
Tigres de Aragua players
People from Clarksville, Virginia
20th-century African-American sportspeople
21st-century African-American people